James Charles Armytage ( – 28 April 1897) was an English engraver of the 19th century. He produced over 200 plates.

References

External Links

Further reading
Hunnisett, B.: Dictionary of British Steel Engravers; F. Lewis, 1981. .

English engravers
1800s births
1897 deaths
Year of birth uncertain